Katafygio (Greek language: Καταφύγιο, meaning refuge, shelter, lodge) is a village in Aetolia-Acarnania in Greece. It is built amphitheatrically at an altitude of 620 metres on the Eastern foothills of Makryoro Mountain, which is naked and particularly steep. It borders to the north with Anavriti village, north-east with Kentriki and Aspria villages, southeast with Chrysovo village, northwest with Gavros village and southwest with Anthofyto village. It is about 33 kilometres from Nafpaktos and is accessed by a tarmac road via Nafpaκtos - Anthofyto - Gavros - Golemi and after passing through the imposing rocks of Amorani.

The village is surrounded by 2 hills on the summits of which are found the small churches of St Konstantinos and St Athanasios. The village is divided into 4 equal parts by 4 streams that join towards the lower part of the village. The land here is prone to subsidence and landslip. In 1878, 25 buildings disappeared because of subsidence. The houses and the fields are strengthened with low walls, (demata) in order to stabilise the ground.

In the centre of village is the square with 2 coffee houses and the Holy Church of Koimiseos of Theotokou. In the village there are 2 basketball courts, a children's playground, while at the top of village in the place named Desi there is a traditional hostel called Desi, and in the entrance of the village in the place named Saint Dimitrios there is another one called Katafigio .

The natural environment itself constitutes a beautiful sight. It is worth climbing the gorge of Foniorema, visiting the old mills, the caves, and also the 2 old traditional bridges which are located in very pretty settings.  Also the Holy Church of "Metamorphosis of Sotiros" (Transformation of our Saviour)), built about 13th century and situated near Chrysovo.  This church is what remains of the historic monastery of Sotiros which at that time belonged to Amorani, (Katafigio), and which was closed in 1834.

History
The old name of the village was Amorani. In 1928, it was renamed Katafygio (Katafigio). The new name of the village resulted from the fact that at the time of the Ottoman occupation the area represented a genuine refuge. The abundance of caverns, and the rocky and steep terrain rendered the village exceptionally inaccessible.

It is not certain when it was founded, however it exists as a village round 1550–1575, at which time we find it registered in Turkish tax documents in the region of Kravara.

During the period of Ottoman domination it constituted one of the main villages of the region. Around 1700 two families of cattle-breeders moved home to the western side of the Makryoro mountain and created a small settlement, named Golemi. This historical relationship renders Golemi an integral part of Katafygio (Katafigio). Administratively Katafygio (Katafigio) village from 1836 until 1912 belonged to the municipality of Apodotia. With the royal decree on 31 August 1912 261/Α/1912 it was recognized as the community of Amorani. It was renamed to Katafygio (Katafigio) by the decree of 9 September 1927 of the official Journal of the Hellenic Republic 206/A/1927. Included in the community is the small settlement of Golemi.

With the application of the Kapodistria law it constitutes henceforth the Municipal District of Katafygio, (Katafigio), in the Municipality of Apodotia in Aetolia-Acarnania, Greece and it occupies 23.429 stremmata (measure of area, 1 stremma = 1000 sq meters, 4 stremmata = approx 1 acre), while the census of 2011 recorded 322 individuals making it one of the more vibrant villages of the mountainous Nafpaktia area. Historically the residents lived by livestock farming, maintaining a significant number of animals, an activity which the remaining residents still carry on today.

Historical population of Katafygio community

References

External links
Katafigio Nafpaktias
Katafigio - Amorani

Populated places in Aetolia-Acarnania